"Abe Lincoln in Illinois" was an American television play broadcast on NBC on February 5, 1964, as part of the television series, Hallmark Hall of Fame. It was adapted from Robert E. Sherwood's 1938 Pulitzer Prize-winning play. Jason Robards was nominated for an Emmy as outstanding single performance by an actor in a leading role for his portrayal of Lincoln.

Plot
The program follows the plot of Robert E. Sherwood's 1938 play, Abe Lincoln in Illinois. It covers the life of Abraham Lincoln before moving to Washington, D.C. It covers his life in New Salem in the 1830s, in Springfield in the 1840s, his courtship of Mary Todd Lincoln, and the Lincoln–Douglas debates.

Cast
The cast included:

 Jason Robards as Abe Lincoln
 Kate Reid as Mary Todd
 James Broderick as Joshua Speed
 Hiram Sherman as Judge Bowling Green
 Douglass Watson as Ninian Edwards
 Burt Brinckerhoff as William Herndon
 Roy Poole as Seth Gale
 Staats Cotsworth as Crimmin
 Mildred Trares as Ann Rutledge
 William Hansen as Mentor Graham
 James Congdon as Jack
 Don Gantry as Jasp
 Nan McFarland as Nancy Green
 Joan Hotchkis as Elizabeth Edwards
 Toni Darnay as Aggie Gale
 Jack Bittner as Stephen A. Douglas
 Tom Slater as Robert Lincoln
 Casey Peters as Willie Lincoln
 Harry Ellerbe as Barrick
 Frederic Tozere as Sturveson

Production
The program was broadcast on NBC on February 5, 1964, as part of the television program Hallmark Hall of Fame. George Schaefer was the producer and director. Robert Hartung was the associate producer and also wrote the television adaption from Robert E. Sherwood's Pulitzer Prize-winning 1938 play. Jason Robards portrayed Lincoln and received an Emmy nomination for outstanding single performance by an actor in a leading role.

References

1962 television plays
American television films
1962 American television episodes